John Laing was a 15th-century bishop of Glasgow. He was from the family of "Redhouse" in the shire of Edinburgh. Before becoming bishop he was rector of Tannadice in Angus, vicar of Linlithgow, and was rector of Newlands in the diocese of Glasgow when he was appointed to the see in 1474. In 1476 he founded the Franciscan Monastery or 'Greyfriars' of Glasgow in conjunction with Thomas Forsyth, Rector of Glasgow. He was appointed Chancellor of Scotland in 1482. He died on 11 January 1483.

References

Citations

Bibliography 

Dowden, John, The Bishops of Scotland, ed. J. Maitland Thomson, (Glasgow, 1912)

15th-century births
1483 deaths
Bishops of Glasgow
Place of birth missing
Year of birth missing
Lord chancellors of Scotland
People from Midlothian
15th-century Scottish Roman Catholic bishops
Treasurers of Scotland